The 1941–42 Challenge Cup was the 41st staging of rugby league's oldest knockout competition, the Challenge Cup.

First round

Second round

Quarterfinals

Semifinals

Final

References

Challenge Cup
Challenge Cup